The Faculty of Sexual and Reproductive Healthcare (FSRH) is a faculty of the Royal College of Obstetricians and Gynaecologists. It is the standard-setting organisation for family planning and sexual health physicians in the United Kingdom.

Membership
Membership of the faculty is open to physicians who have passed the faculty's examinations and maintain appropriate continuous professional development.

Examinations
The faculty has one examinations:
 Membership of the Faculty of Sexual and Reproductive Healthcare (MFSRH) is mainly completed by Specialty Registrars in contraception and reproductive health

Training and certification
The faculty also oversees the training of physicians who wish to train in inserting the intrauterine device or Implanon, by issuing the Letter of Competence in Intra-Uterine Techniques (LoC IUT) and Letter of Competence in Sub-Dermal Implants (LoC SDI).

The faculty also awards several certificates in special skills applicable to physicians working in contraception, sexual and reproductive healthcare clinics:
 SSM in Abortion Care
 SSM in Menopause
 SSM in Ultrasound

Publications
The faculty publishes a journal, the Journal of Family Planning and Reproductive Health Care, which was established in 1974. The Journal of Family Planning and Reproductive Health Care was relaunched in 2018 as BMJ Sexual & Reproductive Health.

References

External links
 

Medical associations based in the United Kingdom
Medical education in the United Kingdom
Sexual and Reproductive Healthcare